Zelezny, Železný, Zhelezny or Zheleznyi may refer to:

People
 Helen Zelezny-Scholz or Zelezny (1882–1974), Czech-born sculptor
 Jan Železný (born 1966), Czech javelin thrower
 Vladimír Železný (born 1945), Czech businessman and politician

Other uses
 9224 Železný, a minor planet

See also
 Železný Brod, a town in the Czech Republic
 Gus-Zhelezny, an urban locality in Ryazan Oblast, Russia
 
 Zelazny